Lajos Gyökös is a Hungarian sprint canoer who competed in the mid-2000s. He won a gold medal in the K-4 1000 m event at the 2006 ICF Canoe Sprint World Championships in Szeged.

References

Hungarian male canoeists
Living people
Year of birth missing (living people)
ICF Canoe Sprint World Championships medalists in kayak
21st-century Hungarian people